Formigny is a former commune in the Calvados department in the Normandy region in northwestern France. On 1 January 2017, it was merged into the new commune Formigny La Bataille.

History
15 April 1450: Battle of Formigny. The battle of Formigny took place here and the French victory, marked the end of the Hundred Years War in Normandy.
In 1823, Formigny (487 inhabitants in 1821) absorbed Véret (70 inhabitants), in the northwest of the territory. 
 In 1858, Engranville (228 inhabitants in 1856) is divided between Formigny - most of the territory - and Trévières, in the southeast.
 8 June 1944:  Formigny was liberated by elements of US 1st Infantry Division during the initial breakout from Omaha Beach.

Population

See also
Communes of the Calvados department

References

External links

The battle of Formigny (in French)

Former communes of Calvados (department)
Calvados communes articles needing translation from French Wikipedia
Populated places disestablished in 2017